Richard Walter John Montagu Douglas Scott, 10th Duke of Buccleuch and 12th Duke of Queensberry,  (born 14 February 1954), styled as Lord Eskdaill until 1973 and as Earl of Dalkeith from 1973 until 2007, is a Scottish landholder and peer. He is the Duke of Buccleuch and Queensberry, as well as Chief of Clan Scott. He is the heir male of James, Duke of Monmouth (9 April 1649 – 15 July 1685), the eldest illegitimate son of Charles II and his mistress, Lucy Walter, and more remotely in a direct male line from Alan of Dol, who came to Britain in 1066 with William the Conqueror.

Scott was once Scotland's largest private landowner, owning  of Scottish land, but was surpassed by Anders Holch Povlsen who currently holds  in the country.

Early life and education
Scott was born in 1954, the son of John Scott, 9th Duke of Buccleuch, and his wife, Jane Scott, Duchess of Buccleuch, a daughter of  John McNeill, QC. He was baptised with Princess Margaret as one of his godparents.

He was educated at St. Mary's School, Melrose, and Eton College, and was Page of Honour to Queen Elizabeth The Queen Mother from 1967 to 1969. In 1973, his father inherited the Dukedoms of Buccleuch and Queensberry, and Scott took the courtesy title Earl of Dalkeith, having previously been styled Lord Eskdaill. He graduated from the University of Oxford in 1976 with a Bachelor of Arts.

Career

As Earl of Dalkeith, he had a brief term on the board of Border Television from 1989 to 1990, and in 1994 he joined the Millennium Commission as the representative for Northern England. He was made a Knight Commander of the Order of the British Empire (KBE) in the 2000 New Year Honours for his services to the Millennium Celebrations, leaving the commission in 2003. He was president of the National Trust for Scotland from 2003 to 2012, and is a Fellow of the Royal Society of Edinburgh (FRSE).

He also served as Deputy Chairman of the (since abolished) Independent Television Commission, as a member of Scottish Heritage, on the board of the Winston Churchill Memorial Trust, and was President of the Royal Scottish Geographical Society from 1999 to 2005.

He inherited the titles of Duke of Buccleuch and Duke of Queensberry upon his father's death on 4 September 2007.

The art collection of the Dukes of Buccleuch is of great significance, and the recovery of the stolen Leonardo da Vinci painting Madonna of the Yarnwinder from the collection, valued at 30 million GBP, in a raid on the offices of a prestigious law firm captured public attention in 2007. In 2008 a painting in the family collection at Boughton House, a rare portrait of the young Queen Elizabeth I of England, was discovered.

On 1 January 2011, he was appointed Honorary Colonel of the 6th Battalion, The Royal Regiment of Scotland. His honorary colonelcy ended in 2016. In late 2011, he was appointed Deputy Lieutenant of Roxburgh, Ettrick & Lauderdale. In November 2016, he was appointed as Lord Lieutenant of Roxburgh, Ettrick and Lauderdale with effect from 28 December. He was appointed Captain-General of the Royal Company of Archers, The King's Bodyguard for Scotland in 2014.

The Duke is a trustee of the Royal Collection Trust, President of the Georgian Group and an honorary member of the Royal Institution of Chartered Surveyors (HonRICS). The Duke is President of St Andrew's First Aid. The Buccleuch family has held the presidency of St Andrew's First Aid since the early 1900s. In 2019 the Duke retired as chairman of the Buccleuch Group with interests in estate management, wind farms, tourism and hospitality, forestry and property 

In October 2016, the Duke was appointed High Steward of Westminster Abbey, a position previously held by the 5th Duke in the late 19th century. In December 2017, he was appointed as Lord High Commissioner to the General Assembly of the Church of Scotland for the year 2018. In October 2018, he was re-appointed for the year 2019.

The Duke was appointed Knight Companion of the Order of the Thistle (KT) in the 2018 New Year Honours with the appointment dated 30 November 2017. He was appointed Commander of the Royal Victorian Order (CVO) in the 2021 New Year Honours for services to the Royal Collections Trust.

Houses owned by the Duke include Boughton House, Drumlanrig Castle, Dalkeith Palace, Eildon Hall (Scottish Borders) and Bowhill House.

Marriage and family
In 1981, he married Lady Elizabeth Marian Frances Kerr, a daughter of the 12th Marquess of Lothian (and a sister of the 13th Marquess of Lothian, a Conservative politician). They had four children:
Lady Louisa Montagu Douglas Scott (b. 1 October 1982); she married Rupert Trotter on 28 May 2011. They have three children:
Molly Trotter (b. 20 August 2012)
Robin Trotter (b. 21 May 2014)
Iris Trotter (b. 18 April 2017)
Walter Montagu Douglas Scott, Earl of Dalkeith (b. 2 August 1984); he married Elizabeth Honor Cobbe on 22 November 2014. They have three children:
Willoughby Montagu Douglas Scott, Lord Eskdaill (b. 2016)
Lady Hesper Montagu Douglas Scott (b. 2016)
Lady Dido Montagu Douglas Scott (b. 2019)
Lord Charles  Montagu Douglas Scott (b. 20 April 1987) married Frances Summerfield in 2016. They have two sons:
Rufus Montagu Douglas Scott (b. 2017)
Wilfred Montagu Douglas Scott (b. 2019)
Lady Amabel Montagu Douglas Scott (b. 23 June 1992)

The Duchess of Buccleuch and Queensberry is a patroness of the Royal Caledonian Ball.

Arms

Ancestors
Richard Scott is the son of John Scott, 9th Duke of Buccleuch, the principal male heir of James Scott, 1st Duke of Monmouth (9 April 1649 – 15 July 1685), the illegitimate son of King Charles II of England and his mistress Lucy Walter, and Monmouth's wife, Anne Scott, 1st Duchess of Buccleuch (11 February 1651 – 6 February 1732). As such, Scott is a member of the royal House of Stuart.

Through his paternal great-grandmother, Lady Sybil Evelyn de Vere Beauclerk - daughter of William Beauclerk, 10th Duke of St Albans (15 April 1840 – 10 May 1898) and his first wife, Sybil Mary Grey (28 November 1848 – 7 September 1871), granddaughter of Charles Grey, 2nd Earl Grey - Scott is also a descendant of Charles Beauclerk, 1st Duke of St Albans (8 May 1670 – 10 May 1726), another illegitimate son of King Charles II of England and his mistress Nell Gwyn.

Scott's mother, Jane McNeill, was the daughter of John McNeill QC (1899–1982), a British Crown Advocate for China, and Amy Yvonne Maynard (d. 1977), a concert pianist. Through her father, Jane McNeill descended from the ancient Sottish Highland family, the McNeills of Colonsay. One of their forebears, Duncan McNeill, 1st Baron Colonsay, FRSE (20 August 1793 – 31 January 1874), had been Lord Advocate of Scotland.

References

External links
 Official Buccleuch Group of companies website
 Princess Elizabeth I portrait found
 Madonna back to Buccleuch

1954 births
Knights of the Thistle
Knights Commander of the Order of the British Empire
Commanders of the Royal Victorian Order
Fellows of the Royal Society of Edinburgh
Lords High Commissioner to the General Assembly of the Church of Scotland
Living people
People educated at St. Mary's School, Melrose
People educated at Eton College
Alumni of Christ Church, Oxford
Pages of Honour
Deputy Lieutenants of Dumfries 
House of Stuart (Richard)
210
112
Scottish clan chiefs
R
Fellows of the Society of Antiquaries of London
Fellows of the Royal Scottish Geographical Society
Presidents of the Royal Scottish Geographical Society
Scottish landowners
Nobility from Edinburgh